Levitsky versus Marshall, also known as the Gold Coins Game, is a famous game of chess played by Stepan Levitsky and Frank Marshall. It was played in Breslau (now Wrocław) on July 20, 1912, during the master's tournament of the DSB Congress. According to legend, after Marshall's winning last move of the game, gold coins were tossed onto the board by spectators, although this is contested by other accounts.

Game summary
Levitsky tried to counterattack, but Marshall's unexpected winning move put his queen—his most valuable piece—on a square where it could be captured by three of Levitsky's pieces. Legend says that this move immediately triggered a shower of gold.

The "shower of gold"
It is unclear whether the legend that the winning queen move triggered a shower of gold coins is true. Marshall insisted that "the spectators ... threw gold pieces on [his] board at the conclusion of [his] brilliant win over Levitsky", but Israel Horowitz reported that "Marshall's wife, Caroline, disclaims even a shower of pennies." Eric Schiller wrote, "others say they were just paying off their wagers."

The game

White: Stefen Levitsky  Black: Frank Marshall  Opening: French Defence (ECO C10) 
Tournament: DSB Congress XVIII 1912

1. d4 e6 2. e4 d5 3. Nc3 c5 4. Nf3 Nc6 5. exd5 exd5 6. Be2 Nf6 7. 0-0 Be7
Levitsky's idea is to make the black bishop move again.

8. Bg5 0-0 9. dxc5 Be6 10. Nd4 Bxc5 11. Nxe6
Pete Tamburro is highly critical of this move, which exchanges the knight for the bishop, later saying "Marshall has an open line for his king rook, and he will threaten e5 with a beautiful ."

11... fxe6 12. Bg4 Qd6 13. Bh3 Rae8 14. Qd2 Bb4
Black pins the knight to White's queen.

15. Bxf6 Rxf6 16. Rad1 Qc5
Increasing the pressure on c3. Levitsky "figures that Black's threatened 17...Bxc3 18.Qxc3 Qxc3 would give him a lost endgame because of the doubled c-pawns, so he decides to make his queen more active [with 17.Qe2]."

17. Qe2 Bxc3 18. bxc3 Qxc3
Black wins a pawn.

19. Rxd5
White regains his pawn, because of the pin on the e-pawn by White's queen (if 19...exd5?? then mate follows: 20.Qxe8+ Rf8 21.Be6+ Kh8 22.Qxf8#).

19... Nd4 20. Qh5
A better choice would have been 20.Qe4 Rf4 21.Qe5 h6.

20... Ref8
Marshall doubles his rooks on the f-, and, because he has removed the pin on his pawn, threatens 21...exd5. He also threatens 21...Rxf2 because 22.Rxf2?? would allow 22...Qe1+ 23.Rf1 Qxf1#.

21. Re5
Levitsky moves his rook to a safe square and defends e1, but Pete Tamburro notes that 21...Rxf2 was still possible because 22.Rxf2 loses to 22...Qa1+. Marshall, however, "has a greater treat in store".

21... Rh6 22. Qg5
The placement of the queen means White's g2-pawn is overloaded with preventing the knight fork 22...Nf3+ and defending the bishop, so Marshall wins a piece with his next move.

22... Rxh3 23. Rc5 Qg3 (diagram)
Black moves his queen to where it may be captured three ways. Some annotators have even given this move three exclamation marks ("!!!"). Tim Krabbé considers it the third-most stunning move of all time.  Black threatens ...Qxh2#. All three ways of capturing the queen lose, and other escape attempts fail as well:
24.hxg3 Ne2#
24.fxg3 Ne2+ 25.Kh1 Rxf1# (a back-rank mate)
any move by White's rook on f1 loses to 24...Qxh2+ 25.Kf1 Qh1#
24.f4 (or 24.f3) Ne2+ 25.Kh1 Qxh2#
24.Qxg3 (relatively best) Ne2+ 25.Kh1 Nxg3+ 26.Kg1 (if 26.fxg3 Rxf1#) Nxf1 27.gxh3 Nd2 with an easily won endgame, or 26...Ne2+ Kh1 followed by moving the rook on h3 away.
 
0–1
Levitsky resigned.

See also
List of chess games

References

Bibliography

Chess games
1912 in chess
1912 in Poland
History of Wrocław
July 1912 sports events